Break the Science Barrier is a 1996 television documentary written and presented by Richard Dawkins, which promotes the viewpoint that scientific endeavour is not only useful, but also intellectually stimulating and exciting. Featuring interviews with many well-known figures from the world of science and beyond, it was originally broadcast on Channel 4 in the United Kingdom — the first of a series of collaborations between Dawkins and the station — before being released on DVD more than a decade later. The documentary contains many of the themes later expounded in his book Unweaving the Rainbow, which was published two years after the initial broadcast.

References

External links
 Break the Science Barrier on Google Videos

British television documentaries
British television specials
Channel 4 documentaries
Documentary films about science
Works by Richard Dawkins
1996 television specials